In physics, and especially quantum field theory, an auxiliary field is one whose equations of motion admit a single solution. Therefore, the Lagrangian describing such a field  contains an algebraic quadratic term and an arbitrary linear term, while it contains no kinetic terms (derivatives of the field):

and the Lagrangian becomes

Auxiliary fields generally do not propagate, and hence the content of any theory can remain unchanged in many circumstances by adding such fields by hand.
If we have an initial Lagrangian  describing a field , then the Lagrangian describing both fields is

Examples of auxiliary fields are the complex scalar field F in a chiral superfield, the real scalar field D in a vector superfield, the scalar field B in BRST and the field in the Hubbard–Stratonovich transformation.

The quantum mechanical effect of adding an auxiliary field is the same as the classical, since the path integral over such a field is Gaussian. To wit:

See also 

 Bosonic field
 Fermionic field
 Composite Field

References 

Quantum field theory